Grabinianka (also known as the Czarna) is a river of Poland, a tributary of the Wisłoka near Dębica.

Rivers of Poland
Rivers of Podkarpackie Voivodeship